Comfort Eagle is the fourth studio album by American alternative rock band Cake. It was released on July 24, 2001, on Columbia Records, their first with the company.

Release
In its opening week, Comfort Eagle sold about 72,000 copies, debuting at number 13 on the Billboard 200. By 2002, the album had sold 408,000 copies. On February 2, 2003, it was certified gold by the RIAA for shipments of half a million copies.

Critical reception

Comfort Eagle was generally well-received by critics, some noting its similarity to the band's previous albums, for better or worse.

Track listing

Personnel
Cake
 John McCrea – vocals, acoustic guitar, keyboards, percussion
 Vince DiFiore – trumpet, keyboards, backing vocals
 Xan McCurdy – electric guitar, keyboards, backing vocals
 Gabriel Nelson – bass guitar, keyboards, backing vocals
 Todd Roper – drums, percussion, Moog synthesizer, backing vocals
 Tyler Pope – keyboard, electric guitar ("Opera Singer", "Short Skirt/Long Jacket", "Arco Arena")
Technical
 Kirt Shearer – mixing
 David Cole – mixing
 Craig Long – mixing
 Gabriel Shepard – mixing
 Don C. Taylor – mastering

Charts
Album

Year-end

Single

Certifications

References

External links
 

2001 albums
Cake (band) albums
Columbia Records albums